William Fawcett (1851–1926) was a British botanist and coauthor of the Flora of Jamaica.

He was born in Arklow, County Wicklow, on 13 February 1851. He studied at the University of London, obtaining a BSc in 1879. He became a Fellow of the Linnean Society in 1881 and was an assistant in the Department of Botany in the British Museum from 1880-1886.

Fawcett was Director of Public Gardens and Plantations in Jamaica from 1887 to 1908.  He then returned to Britain where he worked with Alfred Barton Rendle to produce the first few volumes of the Flora of Jamaica,
(illustrated by Beatrice O. Corfe and Helen Adelaide Wood).<ref name=metadatBHL>BHL: Metadata for Flora of Jamaica, containing descriptions of the flowering plants known from the island.]. Retrieved 14 March 2019.</ref>

He died at Blackheath, London on 14 August 1926.

References

External linksFlora of Jamaica, containing descriptions of the flowering plants known from the island, by William Fawcett and Alfred Barton Rendle. London 1910. at BHL The banana, its cultivation, distribution and commercial uses, by William Fawcett. London, Duckworth 1921. at BHL Bulletin of the Department of Agriculture, Jamaica, by William Fawcett. Kingston, Botanical Dept., Vol.1 , Vol.2 , Vol.3 , Vol.4 , Vol.5 & 6 Economic plants. An index to economic products of the vegetable kingdom in Jamaica  by William Fawcett. Jamaica, Govt. Print. Establishment 1891. at BHL A provisional list of the indigenous and naturalised flowering plants of Jamaica '',by William Fawcett. Kingston 1893. at Nybg [http://mertzdigital.nybg.org/cdm/compoundobject/collection/p9016coll23/id/12589/rec/28

1851 births
1926 deaths
19th-century British botanists
20th-century British botanists
Botanists active in the Caribbean
Jamaican academics